Cecil Dudley Seddon (3 July 1902 – 18 April 1978) was an Australian sportsman who represented New South Wales in both cricket and rugby league.

Rugby league
Seddon played rugby league for the Newtown in the New South Wales Rugby League from 1920 to 1926. He was one of the New South Wales rugby league team's three-quarters in a representative match against Queensland on 5 June 1921.

Cricket
Seddon made his first-class cricket debut in a 1926/27 Sheffield Shield match against Queensland. A middle order batsman, Seddon made just six and four.

He had to wait a year to make his next first-class appearance, which came against Tasmania in 1927/28. Seddon again didn't have an impact, making 10 and 22 in his two innings.

The right-hander made three appearances in New South Wales's winning 1928/29 Sheffield Shield campaign. His best performance came against Queensland at the Sydney Cricket Ground, where he made a pair of half centuries (80 and 59). Also that summer, Seddon played a first-class match against Tasmania in Hobart and scored a career best 134. It was his final first-class innings.

National selector
Seddon was a selector for the Australia national cricket team from 1954 to 1967.

References

1902 births
1978 deaths
Australian rugby league players
New South Wales rugby league team players
Newtown Jets players
Australian cricketers
New South Wales cricketers
Australia national cricket team selectors
Rugby league players from Sydney
Cricketers from Sydney
Rugby league wingers